Associazione Sportiva Dilettantistica Pierantonio Calcio 1965 or simply Pierantonio is an Italian association football club, based in Pierantonio, a frazione of Umbertide, Umbria.

Pierantonio currently plays in Serie D.

History 
The club was founded in 1965.

Serie D 
In the season 2010–11 it was promoted for the first time from Eccellenza Umbria to Serie D.

Colors and badge 
The team's colors are white and blue.

External links 
Official Site

Football clubs in Italy
Football clubs in Umbria
Association football clubs established in 1965
Italian football clubs established in 1965